, or  (literally "great luck"), is a wagashi, (a type of Japanese confection) consisting of a small round mochi (a glutinous rice cake) stuffed with a sweet filling, most commonly anko, (a sweetened red bean paste made from azuki beans). Daifuku is a popular wagashi in Japan and is often served with green tea.

Daifuku comes in many varieties. The most common are white, pale green, or pale pink-colored mochi filled with anko. Daifuku are approximately 4 cm (1.5 in) in diameter. Nearly all daifuku are covered in a fine layer of rice flour (rice starch), corn starch, or potato starch to keep them from sticking to each other or to the fingers. Though mochitsuki is the traditional method of making mochi and daifuku, they can also be cooked in the microwave.

History 
Daifuku was originally called  (belly thick rice cake) because of its filling's nature. By the end of the 18th century, daifuku were gaining popularity, and people began eating them toasted. They were also used for gifts in ceremonial occasions.

Varieties 

Some versions contain whole pieces of fruit, mixtures of fruit and anko, or crushed melon paste. Some are covered with confectioner's sugar or cocoa powder.
 

 
 A version where azuki beans or soybeans are mixed into mochi and/or azuki sweetfilling.

 
 A version which contains unsweetened anko filling; it has a mild salty taste.

 

 
 A variation containing strawberry and sweet filling, most commonly anko, inside a small round mochi. Creams are sometimes used for sweet filling. Because it contains strawberry, it is usually eaten during the springtime. It was invented in the 1980s. Many patisseries claim to have invented the confection, so its exact origin is vague.

 
 A version which contains sweetened Japanese apricot instead of azuki sweetfilling.

 
 A version which contains coffee flavored sweetfilling.

 
 A version which contains puréed, sweetened chestnuts (Mont Blanc cream) instead of azuki sweetfilling.

 
 A version which contains crème caramel (プリン) instead of  azuki sweetfilling.

 
A version which contains ice cream instead of  azuki sweetfilling.

See also 

 Nuomizi
  – A brand name of mochi ice cream made by the company Lotte.

References

External links 

 

Glutinous rice dishes
Wagashi